The Harold Byrd Mountains, also known more simply as the Byrd Mountains, are a group of exposed mountains and nunataks which extend in an east–west direction between the lower part of Leverett Glacier and the head of the Ross Ice Shelf in Antarctica. They were discovered in December 1929 by the Byrd Antarctic Expedition geological party under Laurence Gould, and named by Rear Admiral Richard E. Byrd for D. Harold Byrd, a cousin of his and a contributor towards the purchase of furs for the expedition.

References

Mountain ranges of Marie Byrd Land